The 2014 Bolivarian Beach Games, officially the II Bolivarian Beach Games, is an international multi-sport event held from December 3–12, 2014 in Huanchaco, Peru. Peru also hosted the inaugural edition in 2012, with Lima as the host city. Athletes from six Bolivarian countries and three invited countries (Dominican Republic, El Salvador, and Paraguay) participated in these Games.

The Games
The Games took place in Huanchaco Sport Center, a sport complex already used for 2013 Bolivarian Games in Trujillo.

Participating nations
ODEBO Members
 
 
 
 
 
  (Host)
 

Invited nations

Mascot
Huanchaquin is the mascot for this edition of Bolivarian Beach Games. Created by designer José Raúl Quiroz Flores, the mascot is inspired from caballito de totora.

Sports

 
 
 
 
 
 
 
 
 Subaquatics (15)
 
 Open water finswimming (12) (details'')

Medal table
Final medal tally

References

Beach
Bolivarian Beach Games
2014 in South American sport
Multi-sport events in Peru
International sports competitions hosted by Peru
Bolivarian Beach Games
December 2014 sports events in South America